José David Contreras Verna (born 20 October 1994), is a Venezuelan professional footballer who plays as a goalkeeper for Águilas Doradas.

References

External links

Living people
1994 births
People from Guasdualito
Association football goalkeepers
Venezuelan footballers
Venezuela international footballers
Venezuela youth international footballers
Venezuela under-20 international footballers
Venezuelan Primera División players
Ligue 2 players
Categoría Primera A players
Deportivo Táchira F.C. players
LB Châteauroux players
Deportivo Pasto footballers
Expatriate footballers in France
Expatriate footballers in Colombia